Ricardo Vizcarra Michaca (December 10, 1947 – October 11, 2016), known by his stage name Dick Israel, was a Filipino character actor who played mostly villain and sidekick roles in many Filipino movies. He later branched out in television playing father and supporting roles.

On October 11, 2016, Israel suffered blood vomiting, and later died in his home, according to actress Vivian Velez, a member of the Damay Kamay Foundation. He was 68. His wife, Marilyn Michacha, died less than week later due to unrelated circumstances. Before his death, Israel was seeking help after his residence in Bagong Barrio, Caloocan was damaged in a fire in July of the same year.

Filmography

Film

1970s
Bobby Jerrylito Cañada Boy Habal ni Tonet (1975)
Mga Uhaw na Bulaklak (1975)
Ligaya Mo'y Inagaw Mo (1976)
Makamandag si Adora (1976)
Escolta: Mayo 13, Biyernes ng Hapon (1976)
Ikaw... Ako, Laban sa Mundo (1976)
Walang Bakas na Naiiwan (1977)
Bloody Hero (1977)
Lalaki, Babae Kami (1977)
Gameng (1977)
Hindi Sa iyo ang Mundo, Baby Porcuna (1978)
Boy Pena (1978)
Joe Quintero (1978)
Doble Kara (1978)
Holdup (Special Squad:D.B) (1979)
Tom Cat (1979)
Boy Putik (1979)
Pepeng Kulisap (1979)
Aliw (1979)

1980s
Palawan (1980)
Biktima (1980)
Misson... Terrorize Panay (1980)
Magno Barumbado (1980)
Kalibre 45. (1980)
Sa Init ng Apoy (1980)
Cover Girl (1981)
Boy Nazareno (1981)
Laya (1981)
Pepeng Shotgun (1981)
Dugong Mandirigma (1981)
Hot Nights (1981)
Kambal sa Baril (1981)
T-Bird at Ako (1982)
Isaac... Dugo ni Abraham (1982)
Brother Ben (1982)
Maguindanao (1982)
Pedring Taruc (1982)
Estong Tutong: Ikalawang Yugto (1983)
Inside Job (1983)
Digmaan Sa Pagitan ng Langit at Lupa (1983)
Intrusion: Cambodia (1983)
To Love Again (1983)
Sumuko Ka Na, Ronquillo (1983)
JR (1983)
Hanggang sa Huling Bala (1984)
Soltero (1984)
Kriminal (1984)
Sekreta Ini (1984)
Idol (1985)
Ben Tumbling (1985)
Bilang na ang Oras mo (1985)
Blood Debts (1985)
Revenge for Justice (1985)
The Sangley Point Robbery (1985)
Calapan Jailbreak (1985)
Isusumpa Mo Ang Araw Nang Isilang Ka (1985)
Kapirasong Dangal (1986)
Alindog (1986)
Araaayyyyy!!! (1986)
Materyales Fuertes (1986)
Flesh Avenue (1986)
Desperada (1986)
Dongalo Massacre (1986)
No Return No Exchange (1986)
Salamangkero (The Magician) (1986)
Humanda Ka, Ikaw ang Susunod (1986)
Hudas (1987)
Anak ng Lupa (1987) 
Lala (1987)
Sparrow Unit: The Termination Squad (1987) 
G.I. Baby (1987)
Sgt. Victor Magno: Kumakasa Kahit Nag-iisa (1988) 
Akyat Bahay Gang (1988) 
Ambush (1988) 
Kumander Bawang: Kalaban ng Mga Aswang (1988)
Dugo ng Pusakal (1988) 
Mula Paa Hanggang Ulo (1989) ... Dikya 
Arrest: Pat. Rizal Alih – Zamboanga Massacre (1989) 
Salisi Gang (1989) 
Ang Lihim ng Golden Buddha (1989) 
Bir Mammud: Alyas Boy Muslim (1989) 
Killer vs. Ninjas (1989)
Bala... Dapat kay Cris Cuenca, Public Enemy No. 1 (1989)
Sgt. Melgar (1989)
Hindi Pahuhuli ng Buhay (1989) 
Durugin ng Bala si Peter Torres (1989) 
Black Sheep Baby (1989) 
Handa Na ang Hukay Mo, Calida (1989) 
Galit sa Mundo (1989) 
Boy Kristiano (1989) 
Sa Diyos Lang Ako Susuko (1989) 
Nazareno Apostol: Boy Ahas (1989)

1990s
Asiong Salonga: Hari ng Tondo (1990)
Hepe: ...Isasabay kita sa Paglubog ng Araw (1990)
Sgt Patalinhug: CIS Special Operations Group (1990)
Ibabaon Kita sa Lupa (1990)  (Movietrailer Channel: ABS-CBN Movieparade)
Biokids (1990) 
Hulihin si... Boy Amores (1990) 
Kristobal: Tinik sa Korona (1990) 
Hukom .45 (1990) 
Kahit Singko, Di Ko Babayaran ang Buhay Mo (1990) 
Ayaw Matulog ng Gabi (1990) 
David Balondo ng Tondo (1990) 
Walang Awa Kung Pumatay (1990) 
Walang Piring ang Katarungan (1990)  (Movietrailer Channel: ABS-CBN Movieparade)
Hanggang Saan ang Tapang Mo (1990) 
Bad Boy (1990) 
Iisa Isahin Ko Kayo! (1990) 
Tapos Na ang Lahi Mo, Hadji Djakiri (1990) 
Kapitan Paile: Hindi Kita Iiwanang Buhay (1990) - Engr. Isidro Altarejos  (Movietrailer Channel: ABS-CBN Movieparade)
Anak ni Baby Ama (1990) 
Dino Dinero (1990) 
Kaaway ng Batas (1990) ... Buyer of Dope 
Boyong Mañalac: Hoodlum Terminator (1991) (Release Date: January 9, 1991)
Iputok mo Idadapa Ako! (Hard to Die) (1991) (Release Date: January 16, 1991)
Lintik Lang ng Walang Ganti! (1991) ... Javier (Release Date: January 30, 1991)
Maging Sino Ka Man (1991)
Para sa Iyo ang Huling Bala Ko (1991) ... Danilo (Release Date: March 30, 1991) 
Kung Patatawarin ka ng Bala Ko! (1991) (Release Date: June 19, 1991)
Markang Bungo: The Bobby Ortega Story (1991) (Release Date: July 24, 1991)
Ganti ng Api (1991) ... *** (Release Date: September 25, 1991)
Alyas Pogi 2 (1991) ... Shabu Distributor (Release Date: October 23, 1991)
Magdaleno Orbos: Sa Kuko ng mga Lawin (1991) (Release Date: November 6, 1991)
Kumukulong Dugo (1991) (Release Date: November 27, 1991)
Alyas Ninong: Huling Kilabot ng Tondo (1992) (Release Date: January 29, 1992)
Magnong Rehas (1992) ... Boy Negro (Release Date: April 8, 1992)
Eddie Tagalog: Pulis Makati (1992) (Release Date: March 21, 1992)
Manong Gang: Ang Kilabot ang Maganda (1992) (Moviestars Production) (Release Date: July 22, 1992) (Directed by: Tedmund)
Big Boy Bato: Kilabot no Kankaloo (1992) (Regal Films) (Release Date: August 5, 1992) (Directed by: Tedmund)
Jerry Marasigan, WPD (1992) (Release Date: August 12, 1992)
Bad Boy II (1992) (Release Date: August 26, 1992)
Lacson, Batas ng Navotas (1992) (Release Date: October 28, 1992)
Aswang (1992)
Andres Manambit: Angkan sa Matatapang (1992) (Release Date: December 25, 1992) (Official to 1992 MMFF)
Humanda Ka Mayor!: Bahala Na ang Diyos (1993)
Abel Morado: Ikaw ang May Sala (1993)
Enteng Manok: Tari ng Quiapo (1993)
Patapon (1993)
Kung Kailangan Mo Ako (1993)
Pita: Terror ng Caloocan (1993)
Galvez: Hanggang sa Dulo ng Mundo Hahanapin Kita (1993) (Release Date: May 26, 1993)
The Vizconde Massacre Story (God Help Us!) (1993)
Doring Borobo (1993) (Release Date: December 25, 1993) (Official to 1993 MMFF)
Hindi Pa Tapos ang Laban (1994)
Pusoy Dos (1994)
Baby Paterno (Dugong Pulis) (1994)
Tony Bagyo: Daig Pa ang Asong Ulol (1994)
Markadong Hudas (1994)
Pedrito Masangkay: Walang Bakas na Iniwan (1994)
Epimaco Velasco: NBI (1994)
Nagkataon ... Nagkatagpo (1994) (Release Date: May 25, 1994) (With: Rudy Fernandez R.I.P., and Maricel Soriano) (Directed by: Augusto Salvador)
Bawal Na Gamot (1994)
Lagalag: The Eddie Fernandez Story (1994) (Release Date: September 28, 1994) (Directed by: Romy V. Suzara)
Kanto Boy 2: Ang Anak ni Totoy Guapo (1994) (Release Date: December 25, 1994, of MMFF) (Directed by: Augusto Salvador)
Dog Tag: Katarungan sa Aking Kamay (1995)
Alfredo Lim: Batas ng Maynila (1995)
Matimbang Pa sa Dugo (1995)
Melencio Magat: Dugo Laban sa Dugo (1995)
Ang Titser Kong Pogi (1995) (Release Date: October 11, 1995)
Ang Pinakamagandang Hayop sa Balat ng Lupa (1996)
Maginoong Barumbado (1996) (Release Date: February 29, 1996) (With Phillip Salvador)
Da Best in da West 2: Da Western Pulis Istori (1996)
Aringkingking (1996)
Rubberman (1996)
Angela: Sabik sa Pagmamahal (1997)
Babangon Ang Huling Patak ng Dugo (1997)
Hapdi ng Tag-init (1997)
Tapang sa Tapang (1997)
Iskalawag: Ang Batas Ay Batas (1997)
Lihim ni Madonna (1997)
Strebel: Gestapo ng Maynila (1997)
Pakawalang Puso (1998)
Curacha: Ang Babaeng Walang Pahinga (1998)
Squala (1998)
Tulak ng Bibig, Kabig ng Dibdib (1998)
Ginto't Pilak (1998)
Ang Erpat Kong Astig (1998)
Wansapanataym (1999)
Noriega: God's Favorite (1999)

2000s
Laro sa Baga (2000)
Narinig Mo Na Ba ang L8est? (2001)
Alas-Dose (2001) (With Cesar Montano and Sunshine Cruz) (Directed by: Augusto Salvador and Cesar Montano) (Release Date: May 30, 2001)
Carta alas... Huwag ka nang Humirit (2001)
Mano Mano 2: Ubusan ng Lakas (2001)
Basagan ng Mukha (2001)
Sanggano't Sanggago (2001)
Batas ng Lansangan (2002)
Hari ng Selda: Anak ni Baby Ama 2 (2002)
Kilabot at Kembot (2002)
Cass & Cary: Who Wants to Be a Billionaire? (2002)
Super-B (2002)
Pakners (2003)
Fantastic Man (2003)
Mano Mano 3: Arnis the Lost Art (2004)
Makamundo (2004)
Enteng Kabisote: OK Ka Fairy Ko... The Legend (2004)
Happily Ever After (2005)
Ispiritista: Itay, May Moomoo! (2005)
Lagot Ka sa Kuya Ko (2006)
Oh My Ghost! (2006)
Apoy sa Dibdib ng Samar (2006)
Batas Militar (2006)
You Got Me! (2007) - Glenn Ricafort
My Kuya's Wedding (2007) - Peng
Four in One (2007)
Katas ng Saudi (2007)
My Big Love (2008) - Chef Sen
Padre de Pamilya (2009)
Grandpa Is Dead (2009) - Isidro
And I Love You So (2009) - Jun Panlilio

2010s
Dalaw (2010)
Pak! Pak! My Dr. Kwak! (2011)
Enteng ng Ina Mo (2011)

Television

Awards

References

External links

 

1947 births
2016 deaths
Burials at the Manila North Cemetery
Filipino male comedians
Filipino male film actors
Filipino people of Kapampangan descent
Filipino people of Spanish descent
Filipino television personalities
Male actors from Pampanga
People from Pampanga
GMA Network personalities
ABS-CBN personalities